Town Belt is the name used for an urban green belt in New Zealand. There are several notable town belts in the country:

Dunedin Town Belt
Hamilton Town Belt
Wellington Town Belt

When simply describe as "the Town Belt", the term most commonly applies to Dunedin's town belt, the country's oldest.

Geography of New Zealand
Belt regions